Stadium UiTM is a stadium located at Shah Alam, Selangor, Malaysia. Its capacity is 10,000. The stadium was built for Universiti Teknologi MARA and the UiTM Football Club. SPA FC and Selangor F.C. also had used the stadium as their interim home ground. It can also be used as a rugby pitch. Activities organized by the university are sometimes held in the stadium.

UiTM Stadium has once hosted a Malaysia national football team match against Maldives, on 26 November 2009. Malaysia lost the match 0-1.

See also
 Sport in Malaysia

References 

Football venues in Malaysia
Athletics (track and field) venues in Malaysia
Rugby union stadiums in Malaysia
Multi-purpose stadiums in Malaysia
Shah Alam
Sports venues in Selangor
Universiti Teknologi MARA
UiTM FC